Danny Usengimana (born 10 March 1996) is a Rwandan football striker who currently plays for APR. He was a squad member for the 2016 and 2020 African Nations Championships.

References 

1996 births
Living people
Rwandan footballers
Rwanda international footballers
Isonga F.C. players
Police F.C. (Rwanda) players
Singida United F.C. players
Tersana SC players
APR F.C. players
Association football forwards
Rwandan expatriate footballers
Expatriate footballers in Tanzania
Rwandan expatriate sportspeople in Tanzania
Expatriate footballers in Egypt
Rwandan expatriate sportspeople in Egypt
Tanzanian Premier League players
2016 African Nations Championship players
Rwanda A' international footballers
2020 African Nations Championship players